Ángel Noé Alayón (born 29 October 1964) is a Colombian former cyclist. He competed in the team time trial at the 1988 Summer Olympics.

References

1964 births
Living people
Colombian male cyclists
Olympic cyclists of Colombia
Cyclists at the 1988 Summer Olympics
Sportspeople from Bogotá
20th-century Colombian people